Orlando F. Wallihan (December 31, 1833, in Trumbull County, Ohio – August 12, 1912), was a member of the Wisconsin State Assembly.

Career
Wallihan was a member of the Assembly during the 1872 session. Other positions he held include justice of the peace. He was a Republican.

References

People from Trumbull County, Ohio
People from Rock County, Wisconsin
Republican Party members of the Wisconsin State Assembly
American justices of the peace
1833 births
1912 deaths
19th-century American judges